Music is the fourth solo studio album by American rapper Erick Sermon. It was released on October 30, 2001 via J Records, making it his debut album on the label. Production was handled entirely by Sermon, except for the song "It's Nuttin'", which was produced by Rockwilder. The album features guest appearances from Keith Murray, Redman, Cadillac Tah, Daytona, Khari, LL Cool J, Marvin Gaye, Olivia, Scarface and Sy Scott.

The album spawned two singles: "Music" and "I'm Hot". Its title track, "Music", which sampled vocals from Marvin Gaye and in terms of chart position is Sermon's most popular song, peaking at #22 on the Billboard Hot 100, along with inclusion on the soundtrack of the Martin Lawrence/Danny DeVito film What's the Worst That Could Happen?; the music video for the song featured scenes from the film intermixed with clips of Gaye performing in archived music videos and music programs.

The album reached number 33 on the Billboard 200 albums chart making it Sermon's second most popular solo album.

Track listing

Sample credits
Come Thru
"Freddie's Dead" by Curtis Mayfield
Music
"I've Got My Music" (Original Vocal Version of "Turn On Some Music") from Midnight Love and the Sexual Healing Sessions by Marvin Gaye
I'm That Nigga
"(Don't Worry) If There's a Hell Below, We're All Going to Go" by Curtis Mayfield
Genius E Dub
"Genius of Love" by Tom Tom Club
Ain't No Future...2001
"Ain't No Future in Yo' Frontin'" by MC Breed, "More Bounce to the Ounce" by Roger Troutman
I'm Hot
"Sexual Healing" by Marvin Gaye, "Get Down" by Craig Mack
The Sermon
"What I Feel/Issues" by R. Kelly
Music [Remix]
"Turn On Some Music" by Marvin Gaye

Chart history

References

External links

2001 albums
J Records albums
Erick Sermon albums
Albums produced by Rockwilder
Albums produced by Erick Sermon